Liu You (died 21 February 181 BC) was the sixth son of Emperor Gaozu of Han. He was made Prince of Huaiyang in 196 BC, and recreated as Prince of Zhao two years later. You married Empress Dowager Lü's niece and was found to be having affairs with secret mistresses.  Empress Dowager Lü summoned him to the capital and imprisoned him there without food.  While in prison, You made a song cursing the deeds which Empress Dowager Lü had done to the Liu family. He was afraid to commit suicide and ended up starving to death. and given the posthumous name You (幽).

References

181 BC deaths
Han dynasty imperial princes
Year of birth unknown
Emperor Gaozu of Han